1-(3-Chlorophenyl)-4-(2-phenylethyl)piperazine (3C-PEP) is a designer drug of the piperazine class of chemical substances. 3C-PEP is related to meta-cholorophenylpiperazine (mCPP) and phenethylamine that can be thought of as mCPP having a phenylethyl group attached to the nitrogen atom at its 4-position. It was first described in 1994 in a patent disclosing a series of piperazine compounds as sigma receptor ligands.   Later, it was discovered to be a highly potent dopamine reuptake inhibitor.

Pharmacology 
3C-PEP is one of the most potent dopamine transporter (DAT) ligand reported to date. It is highly selective for the dopamine transporter (dissociation constant K = 0.04 nM) with relatively low affinity for the closely related norepinephrine transporter (NET, K = 1107 nM ) and the serotonin transporter (SERT, K = 802 nM).  In addition, the compound has lower (or no) affinity for D2-like receptor (K = 327 nM), serotonin 5-HT2 receptor (K = 53 nM), opioid receptor (K > 10000 nM), and the PCP/NMDA receptor (K > 10000 nM).

With a DAT dissociation constant K of 0.04 nM, 3C-PEP is one of the most potent dopamine transporter ligand described to date in the literature. In comparison, cocaine which is a prototypical DAT ligand and reuptake inhibitor has a dissociation constant K of 435 nm thus making 3C-PEP about 10,000 times more potent than cocaine as a dopamine transporter inhibitor in vitro.

Legal status

United States 
3C-PEP is not scheduled at the federal level in the United States,

Canada 
3C-PEP is not scheduled under the Controlled Drugs and Substances Act.

See also 
 Substituted piperazine
 Etoperidone, nefazodone, and trazodone (structurally related drugs which may also produce mCPP as a metabolite)
 CM156
 Diphenpipenol
 MT-45

References 

Chlorobenzenes
Stimulants
Meta-Chlorophenylpiperazines
Piperazines
Dopamine reuptake inhibitors